The Estonian Defence Forces is the unified military force of the Republic of Estonia. The Estonian Defence Forces consists of the Estonian Land Forces, the Estonian Navy, the Estonian Air Force, and the paramilitary Estonian Defence League. The national defence policy aims to guarantee the preservation of the independence and sovereignty of the state, the integrity of its land area, territorial waters, airspace and its constitutional order. Its main goals remain the development and maintenance of a credible capability to defend the nation's vital interests and development of the defence forces in a way that ensures their interoperability with the armed forces of NATO and European Union member states to participate in the full range of missions for these military alliances.

History

After the German Revolution, between 11 and 14 November 1918, ending the German occupation in Estonia, the representatives of Germany formally handed over political power to the Government of Estonia. A few days later Estonia was invaded by the military forces of Bolshevist Russia, marking the beginning of the Estonian War of Independence. The small, poorly armed Estonian military, also known as the Peoples Force (in ), was initially pushed back by the Red Army into the vicinity of the capital city of Estonia - Tallinn. A mere 34 kilometers separated Tallinn and the front line. Partly due to the timely arrival of a shipment of arms brought by a British naval squadron the Bolsheviks were stopped.

In January 1919, the Estonian armed forces launched a counteroffensive, the May Offensive, under Commander-in-Chief Johan Laidoner. The Ground Forces were supported by the Royal Navy as well as Finnish, Swedish and Danish volunteers. By the end of February 1919, the Red Army had been expelled from all of the territory of Estonia. On 2 February 1920, the Peace Treaty of Tartu was signed by the Republic of Estonia and the Russian Soviet Federative Socialist Republic. After winning the Estonian Liberation War against Soviet Russia and German Freikorps volunteers, Estonia maintained its independence for twenty-two years.

In August 1939, just prior to the start of World War II, Stalin and Hitler secretly decided the fate of the Republic of Estonia. The two leaders agreed to divide Eastern Europe into "spheres of special interest" as outlined by the Molotov–Ribbentrop Pact in its Secret Additional Protocol. According to this treaty Estonia was to be occupied by the Soviet Union.  The Estonian government decided to give their assent to an agreement which allowed the USSR to establish military bases and station 25,000 troops on Estonian soil for "mutual defence". On 12 June 1940, the order for a total military blockade of Estonia was given to the Soviet Baltic Fleet. Given the overwhelming Soviet force, in order to avoid bloodshed and a futile and hopeless war, on 17 June 1940 the Estonian government decided not to resist. The military occupation of Estonia was complete by 21 June 1940. The armed forces of Estonia were disarmed in July 1940 by the Red Army according to Soviet orders. Only the Signal Battalion stationed in Tallinn at Raua Street, in front of the Tallinn School No. 21 continued to resist. As the Red Army brought in additional reinforcements supported by armoured fighting vehicles, the battle lasted several hours until sundown. There was one dead, several wounded on the Estonian side and about 10 killed and more wounded on the Soviet side. Military resistance ended with negotiations. Signal Battalion surrendered and was disarmed. In the Second World War, many Estonians joined German Wehrmacht auxiliary units, as well as eventually contributing the volunteers and conscripts for the 20th Waffen Grenadier Division of the SS (1st Estonian) which fought against the Red Army.

The Estonian Defence Forces was restored on 3 September 1991 by the Supreme Council of the Republic of Estonia. Since 1991, the armed forces of Estonia have re-opened and restored more than 30 old and new units and several army branches.

Since 2011, the Commander of the Estonian Defence Forces is appointed by and is responsible to the Government of Estonia through the Ministry of Defence, rather than to the Riigikogu, as it had been before. It was due to constitutional amendments proposed by the former President of Estonia, Toomas Hendrik Ilves.

Structure

Its main goals remain the development and maintenance of a credible capability to defend the nation's vital interests and development of the EDF in a way that ensures their interoperability with the armed forces of NATO and EU member states and their capability to participate in the full range of Alliance missions.

In peacetime, the main tasks of EDF are to monitor and maintain control over territorial borders and airspace, maintain combat readiness, train conscripts and develop reserve units, participate in NATO and UN-led international missions, and provide assistance to civilian authorities in case of national emergency.

In crises, the main tasks of EDF are to increase the readiness levels of units as required, prepare for transition to wartime structure and begin mobilization as ordered, integrate units from other ministries, and prepare for assistance from and reception of friendly forces.

In wartime the main tasks of EDF are to defend the territorial integrity of the state, to facilitate the arrival and deployment of forces from other countries and co-operate with them, to maintain control over national airspace, and facilitate the air defence of strategic assets in co-operation with forces from other countries.

Leadership of the national defence
The national defence of Estonia is conducted on the principles of civilian control inherently bound with the democratic organisation of the state. Democratically elected and appointed executive institutions make decisions on the use of the defence forces and determine the respective objectives, allocate the necessary resources and monitor the attainment of the objectives.
The implementation of the principles of civilian control is guaranteed by defence-related rights, obligations and responsibilities legislatively laid upon the parliament, the president of the republic and the government of the republic.
The highest leader of the national defence is the president of the republic advised in national defence matters by the National Defence Council composed of the chairman of the Parliament, the prime minister, the chief of the defence forces (the commander-in-chief of the defence forces in wartime), the defence minister, the Minister of Internal Affairs, the Minister of Foreign Affairs and the Chairman of the Parliamentary National Defence Committee. Executive power in the leadership of the national defence is executed by the Government of the Republic.

Headquarters

In peacetime the Estonian Defence Forces and the national defence organisations, including the Defense League, are led by the Commander of the Estonian Defence Forces. In wartime all these components are commanded by the commander-in-chief of the defence forces. The chief of the defence forces and the commander-in-chief of the defence forces are both appointed and released from office by the Ministry of Defence and the Cabinet on the proposal of the President of the Republic of Estonia.

The Headquarters of the Estonian Defence Forces is the headquarters of the military of Estonia and the working body of the Commander of the Estonian Defence Forces. The General Staff is a joint staff engaged with operational leadership, training and development of the defence forces. Operational leadership is implemented by the Operational Staff, which plans and controls operations and ensures defence readiness and mobilisation. The departments for training and development are responsible for long-term and mid-term planning, resource planning, organisation and control of the planning of training and implementation of national defence activities. The general staff of the defence forces is headed by the Chief of the Headquarters of the Estonian Defence Forces.

Land Forces

The Estonian Land Forces is the main arm of the defence forces. The average size of the military formation in peacetime is about 6,700 of whom about 3,200 are conscripts. The Army component of the operational structure consists of 2 infantry brigades. Both infantry brigades act as training and support frames for deployable units. 
The Land Force development priorities are the capability to participate in missions outside the national territory and the capability to perform operations to protect the territory of Estonia, also in co-operation with the Allies.

Navy

The Merevägi is responsible for all naval operations and protecting of the territorial waters of Estonia. The main functions of the naval force are the preparation and organisation of the defence of the territorial waters and coastal line, ensuring the maritime security, communications and sea traffic in the territorial waters and co-operation with NATO and the navies of other friendly countries around. In case of a crisis situation the Merevägi must be ready to defend sea approaches, harbour areas, sea lines of communication and to co-operate with the coalition units. The Merevägi includes units of patrol ships, minesweepers, a frigate and coast guard units, necessary to ensure the security of maritime communications lines and to establish and clear mine barriers. The majority of the naval forces are situated at the Miinisadam naval base. The current structure operates the Mineships Division which also includes a divers group. In addition there are the Naval Academy, Naval Base at Miinisadam and the Naval Headquarters which are situated in Tallinn. 
Since 1995 numerous mine clearance operations have been carried out in Estonian waters in close co-operation with other navies of the Baltic Sea region in order to find and dispose ordnance and contribute to safe seagoing. In 2007 the Merevägi mineships fleet was modernized and equipped with the Sandown class minehunters. In 2010, according to the long-term defence development plan, it was announced that the Merevägi will receive some new capabilities. Of those new warfare capabilities the procurement of multirole fast patrol boats will be the priority. The operational need for such vessels is likely to ensure defence of territorial waters and to improve maritime surveillance.  In addition to the current capabilities the command and control and shore-to-vessel communications will also be further improved.

Air Force

The Estonian Air Force is the main arm of the Estonian aviation forces. The roots of the current organization go back to 1918 when August Roos organized the first Estonian aviation unit. The Independence War gave great impetus to the development of the Estonian Air Force, which had by the middle of the 1930s more than 130 modern aircraft. The organization consisted of the Naval Aviation Group, Flight School, Air Base, Air Defence Artillery Group. Estonian engineers designed and constructed the fighter aircraft, which displayed outstanding performance. The Estonian Air Force was re-established in 1991 with the objectives of controlling Estonian airspace and the air defence of strategic objects.

The Estonian air force was slow to reform because of the severely damaged infrastructure left behind by the Soviet Air Force and air defence units. The Estonian Air Force was restored on April 13, 1994. From 1993 to 1995, Estonia received two Let L-410UVP transport aircraft, three Mil Mi-2, and four Mil Mi-8 helicopters. The service branch received old Soviet radar and AAA equipment. The majority of Estonian Air Force units are stationed at one military airfield, Ämari Air Base, where renovation was completed in 2012. The airfield and garrison at Ämari is focused on preparing and assisting cooperation with NATO and the air forces of partner nations, and allows it to supply the standardized airfield and aircraft services necessary for host nation support.

Estonian Special Operations Force 

Estonian Special Operations Force ESTSOF is the special operations command of the Estonian Defence Forces. Its tasks include special reconnaissance and surveillance, military support and direct action. The primary objective of the Special Operations Force is the development of capabilities for unconventional warfare.

Cyber Command 
The Estonian Defence Forces Cyber Command is responsible for conducting cyber operations to provide support for Ministry of Defence's area of responsibility. Its tasks include ensuring the operation of IT services and conducting defensive and offensive cyberwarfare. It consists of the Headquarters Support and Signal Battalion, Information and Communication Technology Center, Cyber Information Operations Center and Strategic Communications Center.

Cyber security

The Military of Estonia has been introducing a new 21st century based cyber warfare and defence formation in order to protect the vital infrastructure and e-infrastructure of Estonia. One of the leading organization in the Estonian cyber defence is the CERT (the Computer Emergency Response Team of Estonia), established in 2006, as an organisation responsible for the management of security incidents in .ee computer networks. Its task is to assist Estonian internet users in the implementation of preventive measures in order to reduce possible damage from security incidents and to help them in responding to security threats. The unit deals with security incidents that occur in Estonian networks, are started there, or have been notified of by citizens or institutions either in Estonia or abroad. 
On 25 June 2007, Estonian president Toomas Hendrik Ilves met with the president of United States, George W. Bush. Among the topics discussed were the attacks on Estonian e-infrastructure.
The attacks triggered a number of military organisations around the world to reconsider the importance of network security to modern military doctrine. On 14 June 2007, defence ministers of NATO members held a meeting in Brussels, issuing a joint communiqué promising immediate action. First public results were estimated to arrive by autumn 2007.
In the aftermath of the Cyberattacks on Estonia 2007, plans to combine network defence with Estonian military doctrine, and related NATO plans to create a Cybernetic Defence Centre in Estonia, had been nicknamed the "Tiger's Defence", in reference to Tiigrihüpe.

Territorial Defence

Territorial Defence is a reserve force, which is based on the Estonian Defence League - a voluntary military national defence organisation, which acts in the area of responsibility of the Ministry of Defence. It consists of four territorial districts. It is tasked with planning and conducting military operations with units that are under its command.

The Defence League possesses arms and engages in military exercises. The main goal of the Defence League is, on the basis of the citizens’ free will and initiative, to enhance the readiness of the nation to defend its independence and its constitutional order, including in the event of military threat. It plays an important role in supporting the civil structures. Its members aid in putting out wildfires, volunteer as assistant police members, and ensure safety at various events. Units, consisting of voluntary members of the Defence League, also participate in international peace support operations such as in the Balkan states. The Defence League and its affiliated organizations have positive relations with partner organizations in the Nordic countries, the United States and the United Kingdom.

Personnel

The Defence Forces consist of regular military units totaling 6,500 officers and conscripts. The planned size of the operational (wartime) structure as of 2017 was 21,000 personnel, which is to be increased to over 24,400 by 2026. The Estonian Army is structured according to the principle of a reserve force which means that the main part of the defence forces of the state are units in the reserve.

In peacetime the reservists conduct periodic training, and the state purchases equipment and weapons. In wartime the reservists are mobilized into military units. The reserve units are formed on the territorial principle, i.e. conscripts from one area are called up at one time to one unit and after service they are sent to the reserve as one unit. The Estonian Army is always in constant defence readiness in co-operation with the other services.

Conscription

Estonia instituted compulsory military service in late 1991. Around 3200 conscripts, including a small number of women, enter military units of Estonian Defence Forces every year. There are no conscripts in Estonian Air Force. The service is 11 months long for those trained as junior NCOs, drivers, military policemen and specialists. Other soldiers serve 8 months. Conscripts are serving in infantry, artillery, air defence, engineering, communications, naval, combat service support units and antitank, recce, mortar and military police subunits. In 2023, the Estonian Minister of Defence proposed extending the maximum term of compulsory service to 12 months for certain specialties.

According National Defence Development Plan the annual number of conscripts should reach 4000 by 2022 after a revision of medical and physical requirements. Increasing the number of soldiers would require more barracks, weapons and other infrastructure.

Equipment

Operations

International cooperation

Since 2004 Estonia has been a full member of the NATO; it had been one of its foremost priorities since the restoration of independence. The United States is among the countries with which Estonia has very close cooperation in the defence and security fields. Currently, Estonia participates in the NATO Response Force and contributes in NTM-I (NATO Training Mission - Iraq). Until 2009, Estonia had 40 soldiers fighting alongside American Forces in the Iraq War and 150 soldiers, or about 3% of its total active military force, fighting alongside British Forces during the War in Afghanistan. Estonian forces have since been withdrawn from Iraq. In both cases, the units were regularly rotated. Estonia also provides peacekeepers for international missions in both Bosnia and Kosovo within the framework of the KFOR, and also contributes to EU battlegroups and NATO Response Force rotations and the EU’s anti-piracy operations off the coast of Somalia. The Estonian military employs STANAG (NATO interoperable) weapons and equipment acquired from Finland, Sweden, Germany, Denmark, Great Britain, the United States and Israel.

See also
Military of Latvia
Military of Lithuania
Defence Force

Citations

References

External links

Estonian Defence Forces
Chronology of the Estonian Defence Forces (1917–1940 and 1991–present)

 
Estonia